Brazil competed at the 2022 Winter Olympics in Beijing, China, from 4 to 20 February 2022.

On January 17, 2022, Brazil's team of 10 athletes (six men and four women) competing in four sports (five disciplines) was officially named.

Edson Bindilatti and Jaqueline Mourão were the flagbearers during the opening ceremony. Mourão was one of only two athletes together with Montell Douglas of Great Britain to have competed at both Beijing 2008 and 2022. Cross-country skier Manex Silva was the flagbearer during the closing ceremony.

Competitors
The following is the list of number of competitors who participated at the Games per sport/discipline.

Alpine skiing

By meeting the basic qualification standards, Brazil has qualified one male alpine skier.

Men

Bobsleigh

Brazil qualified two sleds: one each in the two-man and four-man. This will permit Brazil to enter four athletes.

Men

* – Denotes the driver of each sled

Cross-country skiing

By meeting the basic qualification standards, Brazil has qualified one male and one female cross-country skier. By finishing in the top-33 of the FIS Nations Ranking at the end of the 2020/2021 season, Brazil qualified another female cross-country skier. Originally, Bruna Moura was selected for one of the female quotas, but was replaced after suffering a car accident in Italy one week before the Olympics.

Distance

Sprint

Freestyle skiing

Brazil qualified one female moguls skier, marking the country's debut in the discipline at the Winter Olympics. US born athlete, with Brazilian citizenship, Sabrina Cass will represent the country.

Moguls

Skeleton

Based on her placement in the IBSF ranking list Nicole Silveira qualified to compete for Brazil.

See also
Tropical nations at the Winter Olympics
Brazil at the 2022 Winter Paralympics

References

Nations at the 2022 Winter Olympics
2022 Winter Olympics
Olympics